The 1942 Turkish Football Championship was the ninth edition of the competition. It was held in May. Harp Okulu won their second national championship title by winning the Final Group in Ankara undefeated.

The champions of the three major regional leagues (Istanbul, Ankara, and İzmir) qualified directly for the Final Group. Trabzon Lisesi qualified by winning the qualification play-off, which was contested by the winners of the regional qualification groups.

Final group

References

External links
RSSSF

Turkish Football Championship seasons
Turkish
Turkey